Trufanovo is a rural locality (a village) in Posyolok Urshelsky, Gus-Khrustalny District, Vladimir Oblast, Russia. The population was 110 as of 2010.

Geography 
Trufanovo is located on the Pol River, 25 km west of Gus-Khrustalny (the district's administrative centre) by road. Savinskaya is the nearest rural locality.

References 

Rural localities in Gus-Khrustalny District